Reggina Calcio took major steps in establishing itself in Serie A under new coach Walter Mazzarri. The relegation battle was the tightest ever, but Reggina's points average was its highest in the top division yet, resulting in a surprising 10th place. That also meant it lost several key players, with Shunsuke Nakamura, Martin Jiránek and Emiliano Bonazzoli being hard to replace.

Squad

Competitions

Overview

Serie A

League table

Results summary

Results by matchday

Results

Coppa Italia

Squad statistics

Goal scorers

Sources
  RSSSF - Italy 2004/05

Reggina 1914 seasons
Reggina